Sportclub Telstar is a Dutch professional association football club based in the town of Velsen-Zuid, North Holland. The team competes in the Eerste Divisie, the second tier of the Dutch football league system. The club was founded on 17 July 1963, as a merger between the professional departments of rivals VSV and Stormvogels. The new club was named Telstar, after the then recently launched communications satellite.

Telstar plays its home games at the BUKO Stadion. Since its founding in 1963, the football club has used The Tornados' song "Telstar" as the entrance tune for home games.

History
When professional football was introduced in the Netherlands, both IJVV Stormvogels and neighbouring club VSV played in the professional leagues. Because of financial problems at both clubs, their professional teams were merged on 17 July 1963. The new club was named Telstar, after the Telstar communication satellite launched that year. Stormvogels and VSV returned to amateur football. In 2001, Telstar and Stormvogels merged again, this time forming Stormvogels Telstar. This merger was disbanded on 1 July 2008, with the professional branch continuing as Telstar.

Its home stadium is the 3,625 seater BUKO Stadion and its home colors are white. VSV won the KNVB Cup in 1938.

Honours
KNVB Cup
Winner: 1937–38
Runners-up: 1916–17
Tweede Divisie
Winner: 1962–63
Eerste Divisie
Runners-up: 1963–64

Club names
1963–2001: Telstar
2001–2008: Stormvogels Telstar
2008–present: Telstar

Results
Below is a table with Telstar's domestic results since the introduction of professional football in 1956.

Current squad

Retired numbers
22:  Luciano van den Berg, defender (2004–2005)—posthumous honour.

Staff
 Andries Jonker (head coach)
 Anthony Correia (assistant coach)
 Gert-Jan Tamerus (assistant coach)
 Edgar Davids (assistant coach)
 Colin van der Meijden (goalkeeping coach)

Historic facts

All-time leading goalscorers

Most appearances

Former managers

References

External links

Official website

 
Association football clubs established in 1963
1963 establishments in the Netherlands
Football clubs in the Netherlands
Football clubs in Velsen